Samaj Ko Badal Dalo is a 1970 Bollywood drama film directed by V. Madhusudhana Rao. The film stars Parikshit Sahni, Sharada (reprising the latter's role from the original version and making this picture as her Hindi film debut), Prem Chopra, Pran, Mehmood, Aruna Irani, Kanchana in pivotal roles. It is a remake of the Malayalam film Thulabharam (1968).

Plot 
The film starts with a court scene in which a woman is held for a heinous crime, prosecuted by a female public prosecutor and recommended for a death penalty to the Court.  When asked by the Judge for any final representation, the woman explains why she committed the crime.

Chhaya is the only daughter of Satyanarayan. Satyanarayan is owner of a Mill, in partnership with Daulatram. Chhaya has a friendship with Shyam, her college fellow. Vimla is the daughter of Kundanlal who is the Private Advocate for the company. One day, Prakash, a young Mill-worker, along with few of his labour union colleagues of the Mill approaches Satyanarayan, requesting timely payment of a Bonus prior to Diwali. Satyanarayan passes on the request to partner, Daulatram, and it falls deaf ears and is refused. Daulatram intends a huge profit instead, and asks to ignore the demand of workers which is indigestible to Satyanarayan.

An heated argument between them results in break-up of the partnership. In retribution after feeling slighted by the argument, Daulatram deceives Satyanarayan cunningly with the help of Kundanlal and claims all of his property and control of the Mill. Homeless Satyanarayan unable to sustain the shock, dies of heart attack leaving Chhaya his alone in the world.

Initially Chhaya seeks shelter to Vimla, who is unable to help on the grounds of her father being Kundanlal. A request to Shyam to have a shelter in his home also receives a rejection from him, he asks her to forget friendships of college days. In fact, Shyam had found her penniless. Then Prakash offers Chhaya his cottage as shelter and requests her to stay with him and his old and poor mother, Gomti. Though hesitant initially, the poor mother welcomes both under such critical condition.

Puran and Churan are roadside lifters. Prakash  enlightens both and then Puran joins the mill as a worker.  Prakash and Chhaya continue their stay happily in the cottage and gradually become parents of three children. Gomti takes care of the children.

One day, Daulatram brings a modern machine to the Mill and announces sacking of 400 of the 1500 mill workers, which Prakash opposes. During negotiations Shyam, who has become the Manager, slaps Prakash, but matter is halted by police intervention. All the labourers under the leadership of Prakash decides to go on hunger strike and wins by interception by government to run the mill. However, Daulatram quickly approaches court and brings a Stay Order. Mill workers on strike, start starving. When Daulatram finds the Mill workers unmanageable at the Mill gate, he calls the police for protection and on the other hand pays money to his goons to finish off Prakash. Prakash falls prey to the goons on a dark evening in a narrow lane and dies. Chhaya in search of a job fails to get any work and situation worsens when her mother-in-law is taken away by her brother Kalicharan to his house and confines her, with a malicious intention of grabbing the cottage in future. Prakash and Chhaya's children then start suffering for want of food & come to the road to beg desperately. When Chhaya learns that her children are begging on streets, she tries to stop them, but they continue. Vendors cheat children for just a fistful of food in exchange of goods, value of which they are unaware. Next, a snack shop owner mistreats the children, under the pretext of theft of snacks by burning the hand of the elder girl by a hot rod from a boiling oil.

The film goes back to the court scene on the screen with Chhaya in the witness box, depicting the whole story and reasons of committing the heinous crime. She says that, she has received only deceit in her life, nothing else, as she is going to die, she takes poison and also gives it to her kids, but the poison also deceives her and the children die in front of her eyes. None of the other villainous characters are visible in the court.

After narration of life story, Chhaya collapses in the witness box due to the effect of poison and later dies in the custody. After finding the injustice with Chhaya, the Public Prosecutor, Vimla, who remains close witness to the entire life of Chhaya becomes disgusted over the trial and becomes very uncomfortable and restless. She then demands to the court to re-run the case, stating just Chhaya but the people involved in this case in fact should be held guilty and punished.

At the same time she holds all of society responsible for such incidences and asks that it too should be held guilty. Vimla demands to the Court to bring a change in the attitude of society by shouting the slogan, which is the title of the film Samaj Ko Badal Dalo.

Cast 
 Parikshit Sahni as Prakash
 Sharada as Chhaya 
 Prem Chopra as Shyam
 Pran as Daulatram
 Mehmood as Puran
 Aruna Irani as Churan
 Kanchana as Vimla
 Nazir Hussain as Satyanarayan 
 Kanhaiyalal as Kundanlal
 C. S. Dubey as Kalicharan 
 Dhumal as Munshiram
 Ram Avtar as Banarasi Das
 Manmohan Krishna as Kashinath Shukla
 Mukri as Balchand
 Shammi as Gomti
 David as Judge

Soundtrack 
The music was composed by Ravi.

References

External links 
 

1970 films
1970s Hindi-language films
1970 drama films
Hindi remakes of Malayalam films
Films directed by V. Madhusudhana Rao
Films scored by Ravi
Indian courtroom films